Dwight Spitz is the third album by the American hip hop artist and multi-instrumentalist Count Bass D, released in 2002.

Overview
After the release of Pre-Life Crisis, Count Bass D felt he had overshot his own talent. In 2002, he decided to make a more hip hop-themed album, so he bought an Akai S-3000 sampler and an MPC-2000 drum machine and quickly learned to create beats using samples. Dwight Spitz is his first album with a more traditional hip hop theme. The album has collaborations with Edan, J. Rawls, Dione Farris and MF DOOM.

A deluxe edition was released on Count Bass D's Bandcamp on August 25, 2013, to celebrate the album's ten year anniversary. The edition included six new bonus tracks.

Critical reception
The A.V. Club called the album "lovingly assembled and wonderfully idiosyncratic." Rolling Stone deemed it a "little headphone masterpiece." The East Bay Express wrote: "Whimsical, original, and extremely funky, the Count's third album is his best yet, overflowing with ear-tickling production and charismatic rhymes."

Track listing

References 

2002 albums
Count Bass D albums